Charles Eager (July 1883 – 17 November 1948) was a South African cricketer. He played in one first-class match for Border in 1906/07.

See also
 List of Border representative cricketers

References

External links
 

1883 births
1948 deaths
South African cricketers
Border cricketers